The Movement in Support of the Army, Defense Industry and Military Science, or simply Movement in Support of the Army (DPA) is a Russian radical nationalist political movement established in 1997. The group was founded by Lev Rokhlin, who was killed in July 1998, and then run by Viktor Ilyukhin and Albert Makashov. As one commentator noted, "By December 1999, the DPA was little more than a mouthpiece for its two leaders' rabid anti-Semitism and it scored close to nil in the elections."

In 1999, the group announced a "green and red" alliance with Geydar Dzhemal's Islamic Committee of Russia.

References

1997 establishments in Russia
Political parties established in 1997
Politics of Russia